Wakey Wakey is a full-length album by punk band Toy Dolls.

Track listing
All writing by Michael "Olga" Algar, except where noted.
  "Introduction"  – 0:57
  "Wakey Wakey Intro"  – 0:21
  "Lester Fiddled The Tax Man"  – 2:19
  "Pot Belly Bill"  – 3:06
  "One Night In Moscow (& We'll Be Russian Home!)"  – 2:42
  "Cloughy Is A Bootboy!"  – 2:50
  "Sabre Dance" (traditional) – 2:38
  "Daveys Took The Plunge"  – 3:33
  "There's A Trollop Up Elmwood Street"  – 2:36
  "No Particular Place To Go" (Chuck Berry) – 2:21
  "Poverty Pleadin' Peter"  – 2:21
  "Blaze Of The Borough"  – 3:10
  "Wakey Wakey Outro"  – 1:54
  "Goodnight Irene" (traditional) – 0:29

Personnel
 Michael "Olga" Algar - Vocals, Guitar
 John "K'Cee" Casey - Bass, Vocals
 Martin "Marty" Yule - Drums, Vocals

References

External links
 Full album lyrics
 Wakey Wakey page on The Toy Dolls website

Toy Dolls albums
1989 albums